Kots may refer to the following people
Aleksandr Kots (1880–1964), Russian zoologist
Alexander Kots (journalist) (born 1978), Russian journalist
Arkady Kots (1872–1943), Russian socialist poet of Jewish descent
Khrystyna Kots-Hotlib (born 1983), Ukrainian singer and beauty pageant 
Nadezhda Ladygina-Kohts (1889–1963), Russian zoopsychologist
Roman Kots (born 1984), Ukrainian football player

See also
KOTS, a radio station in New Mexico, U.S.

Kohenitic surnames